Podočnjaci are a Croatian electronic music group from Kutina, Croatia, consisting of beachboy19, Sinista Ruky and producer Nix K. They have been active since 2020. They attracted the attention of a wider audience with the singles "Šiške", "Papuče", "Predsoblje". The group's debut album Ispod očiju was released in 2021 through Yem.

It was with their first album when they reached the status of one of the favorite concert attractions of the new generation in Croatia, when in the spring of 2022 they held their first independent concert in the Tvornica Kulture in Zagreb, which was followed by performances at the 2022 edition of Zagreb Beer Fest, Beer Day in Karlovac, Beat na moru and others.

Discography

Albums

Extended plays

Singles

Awards and nominations

References

External links
 Official Website
 Instagram
 YouTube
 Spotify
 Deezer
 Apple Music
 Tidal

Croatian hip hop groups
Croatian pop music groups
Musical groups established in 2020
2020 establishments in Croatia